Nevins is an unincorporated community in Indian River County, Florida, United States.

Notes

Unincorporated communities in Indian River County, Florida
Unincorporated communities in Florida